B̤ē is an additional letter of the Arabic script, derived from bāʼ with an additional dot. It is not used in the Arabic alphabet itself, but is used to represent the sound  when writing Hausa, Saraiki, and Sindhi in the Arabic script.

Both Hausa and Sindhi are also written in scripts besides Arabic. The sound represented by b̤ē is written Ɓ ɓ in Hausa's Latin orthography, and written  in Saraiki and Sindhi's Devanagari orthography.

See also
ڄ
ݙ
ڳ
ݨ

External links
 Saraiki Omniglot
 Hausa Omniglot
 Saraiki Alphabet 

Arabic letters